Ranchi Metropolitan Region, also known as the Ranchi Metropolitan Area and Greater Ranchi, is the Urban Agglomeration of Ranchi in the Indian state of Jharkhand. The area is administered by the Ranchi Regional Development Authority (RRDA).

Demographics
According to the 2011 census data, the total population of the Ranchi metropolitan region was 1,456,528. RDDA report states the total area is 652.02 km².

See also
Ranchi district

References

Ranchi
Ranchi district
Ranchi